Northern transitional alpine forests is a temperate coniferous forest ecoregion in the northwestern interior of British Columbia, as defined by the World Wildlife Fund (WWF) categorization system.

Setting
This ecoregion occupies a transitional region of mountains and valleys between the Coast Ranges to the west and the Omineca Mountains to the east.

Climate
This ecoregion varies greatly depending on its proximity to the Pacific coast. In the west it has a warm humid continental climate (Köppen  Dsb ) with warm summers and cold winters. In the east it has a subarctic climate (Köppen  Dfc ) with cool summers and cold winters. Precipitation ranges from 2500mm (98.4 in) in the western coastal areas of the Nass River valley, to 600mm (23.6 in) in the lower elevations of the interior Bulkley Ranges. Temperature varies greatly with elevation, but averages around 13°C (55.4°F) in the summer and -9.5°C (14.9°F) in the winter.

Ecology

Flora
The lower mountains and valleys are dominated by western red cedar, western hemlock, and mountain hemlock. Higher elevations are dominated by lodgepole pine, engelmann spruce, and alpine fir, though to a lesser extent in the west of the ecoregion. Vegetation in the alpine tundra includes discontinuous patches of low-growing heather, sedge, and mountain avens.

Fauna
Fauna found throughout this ecoregion include grizzly bear, American black bear, moose, mountain goat, red fox, and wolves. Parts are also populated by woodland caribou, black-tailed deer, beaver, wolverine, marten, snowshoe hare, ptarmigan, and grouse.

See also
List of ecoregions in Canada (WWF)
Babine Mountains Provincial Park

References

External links 
 

Ecozones and ecoregions of British Columbia
Forests of British Columbia
Nearctic ecoregions
Temperate coniferous forests